The EF 17–40mm 4L USM lens is a wide-angle lens made by Canon Inc. The lens has an EF mount to work with the EOS line of cameras. Other than the front element, it is sealed against dust and water, and features a diaphragm which remains nearly circular from 4 to 8. It is one of the few Canon photo lenses that are parfocal.

Audience
The 17–40mm is the least expensive of Canon's current wide-angle zooms for full-frame bodies, with the EF 16–35mm 4L IS USM and EF 11–24mm 4L USM being more expensive, and the EF 16–35mm 2.8L USM being both faster and more expensive. Weighing 475 g and measuring 83.5 mm x 96.8 mm, it is a popular choice with many photographers because of its light and compact size. A member of the L-series, the 17–40mm is a good substitute for the 16–35mm 2.8 lens, which is heavier and costs approximately twice as much. Canon now sells an image-stabilized 16–35mm 4 lens for about $300 more than the 17–40.

This lens is also a popular step up from the stock kit lens on many of Canon's EOS Digital family of cameras, the EF-S 18–55mm 3.5–5.6, for those still wanting a wide angle lens. On a cropped sensor, it has 35 mm equivalent focal length of 27–64mm. In this role, it is compared with the EF-S 17–55mm lens, with which it can unofficially share lens hoods.

Companion lenses
This lens is often paired with an L series telephoto lens, such as the EF 28–300mm 3.5–5.6 L USM or any of the EF 70–200mm family (4L USM, 4L IS USM, 2.8L USM, 2.8L IS USM, 2.8L IS II USM).

Images

References

External links

 Canon EF 17–40mm f/4L USM
 Canon EF 17–40mm f/4L USM Lens Review

17-40mm
Canon L-Series lenses
Camera lenses introduced in 2003